Earl of Warwick is one of the most prestigious titles in the peerages of the United Kingdom. The title has been created four times in English history, and the name refers to Warwick Castle and the town of Warwick.

Overview
The first creation came in 1088, and the title was held by the Beaumont and later by the Beauchamp families. The 14th earl was created Duke of Warwick in 1445, a title which became extinct on his early death the following year. The best-known earl of this creation was the 16th earl jure uxoris, Richard Neville, who was involved in the deposition of two kings, a fact which later earned him the epithet of "Warwick the Kingmaker". This creation became extinct on the death of the 17th earl in 1499.

The title was revived in 1547 for the powerful statesman John Dudley, 1st Viscount Lisle, who was later made Duke of Northumberland. The earldom was passed on during his lifetime to his eldest son, John, but both father and son were attainted in 1554. The title was recreated or restored in 1561 in favour of Ambrose Dudley, younger son of the Duke of Northumberland. However, Ambrose was childless and the earldom became extinct on his death in 1590.

It was created for a third time in 1618 for Robert Rich, 3rd Baron Rich, in spite of the fact that the Rich family was not in possession of Warwick Castle. From 1673, the earls also held the title of Earl of Holland. All of the titles became extinct on the death of the 8th earl in 1759.

The earldom was revived the same year in favour of Francis Greville, 1st Earl Brooke. The Greville family was in possession of Warwick Castle, and the title and castle were thereby re-united for the first time in over a century. The 1759 creation is extant and currently held by Guy Greville, 9th Earl of Warwick. However, Warwick Castle was sold by the family in 1978, and they currently live in Australia.

1088 creation

The medieval earldom created in 1088 was held to be heritable via a female line of descent, and thus was held by members of several different families. It was traditionally associated in its feudal form with possession of Warwick Castle. The ancient heraldic device of the Earls of Warwick, the Bear and Ragged Staff, is believed to derive from two legendary Earls, Arthal and Morvidus. Arthal is thought to mean "bear", while Morvidus was to have slain a giant "with a young ash tree torn up by the roots." Alternatively the emblem of a bear (Latin ursus) is believed to refer to Urse d'Abetot ( 1040 – 1108), 1st feudal baron of Salwarpe in Worcestershire, a Norman who followed King William the Conqueror to England, and served as Sheriff of Worcestershire. His heir was his son-in-law Walter de Beauchamp (died 1130/3), whose descendant was William de Beauchamp, 9th Earl of Warwick (c.1238–1298).

The first Earl of Warwick was Henry de Beaumont (d.1119), second son of Roger de Beaumont (d. circa 1094) by his wife Adeline de Meulan (c. 1014/20–1081), daughter and heiress of Waleran III, Count of Meulan.  Henry's elder brother was Robert de Beaumont, 1st Earl of Leicester, Count of Meulan, who fought at the Battle of Hastings with William the Conqueror.  The family name of "Beaumont" was Latinised to de Bello Monte ("from the beautiful mountain"); the Warwick branch of the family was also known as de Newburgh, Latinised to de Novo Burgo ("from the new borough/town"). Henry changed his name to "de Newburgh", after the Castle de Neubourg, his home in Normandy, an ancient Beaumont possession. Henry became Constable of Warwick Castle in 1068 and Earl of Warwick in 1088 as reward for his support for the king during the Rebellion of 1088.

The title passed through several generations of the Beaumont family until 1242 when Thomas de Beaumont, 6th Earl of Warwick died without male issue. The earldom then went to his sister, Margaret de Beaumont, 7th Countess of Warwick and her successive husbands jure uxoris, and on her death to her cousin William Mauduit, 8th Earl of Warwick. When he died also without a male heir, the title passed to his sister, Isabel de Mauduit, and her husband Lord William de Beauchamp (d.1268), and thence to her son William de Beauchamp, 9th Earl of Warwick. During this period the Earldom and the Beauchamps were elevated to the highest levels until Henry de Beauchamp, 1st Duke of Warwick, 14th Earl of Warwick, was created Duke of Warwick with precedence over all except the Duke of Norfolk.

This precedence was disputed however and with Henry's death in 1445, also without male issue, the dukedom was extinguished. The earldom went to his infant daughter, and on her death aged 5 a few years later passed to Henry's sister Anne de Beauchamp, 16th Countess of Warwick and her husband Richard Neville, 16th Earl of Warwick, who "succeeded in right of his wife" but was subsequently "confirmed" in that title on 23 July 1449 which confirmation he thereafter resigned and was definitively created Earl of Warwick by letters patent dated 2 March 1450, with his wife being similarly created Countess of Warwick. He is known to history as "Warwick the Kingmaker" and died without male issue in 1471, aged 42, when the Earldom fell into abeyance between his two daughters. After Richard Neville's death the title was passed through his eldest daughter Isabel Neville to her husband George Plantagenet, 1st Duke of Clarence, brother of Kings Edward IV and Richard III, who on 25 March 1472 by letters patent was created Earl of Warwick (and Earl of Salisbury). Although he was so created, The Complete Peerage nevertheless terms him the 17th Earl of Warwick, which suggests perhaps that the creation was considered a mere formality and confirmation of his inheritance. He was attainted and executed in 1478 whereupon his titles became forfeited. His Earldom was forfeited and thus not able to be inherited by his son Edward Plantagenet, who did however manage to inherit it from his maternal grandmother Anne de Beauchamp (d.1492), wife of "Warwick the Kingmaker", who had been created Countess of Warwick by letters patent in 1450, at the same time her husband was created Earl of Warwick. He thus became  Edward Plantagenet, 17th Earl of Warwick, but on his beheading for treason in 1499 the title became forfeited.

1547 creation

The title was next conferred upon the powerful statesman and soldier John Dudley, 1st Viscount Lisle. He had already been created Viscount Lisle in right of his deceased mother, Elizabeth Grey, in 1543, and was made Earl of Warwick in the Peerage of England in 1547. In 1551 he was further honoured when he was created Duke of Northumberland. In January 1553 Parliament passed the earldom to his eldest son John, the second Earl. He died young in 1554, and having been attainted along with his father in August 1553, the title became extinct until it was revived in 1561 for his younger brother Ambrose, the third Earl. He served as Master-General of the Ordnance and Lord Lieutenant of Warwickshire. On his death in 1590 the earldom became extinct.

1618 creation

The title was re-created when Robert Rich, 3rd Baron Rich, was made Earl of Warwick  in 1618. This was despite the fact that the Rich family were not in possession of Warwick Castle (this was in the hands of the Greville family; see the 1759 creation below). His second son Henry Rich was created Baron Kensington in 1623 and Earl of Holland in 1624. Lord Warwick was succeeded by his eldest son, the second Earl. He represented Maldon in the House of Commons and served as Lord Lieutenant of Essex.

His eldest son, the third Earl, sat as Member of Parliament for Essex. He died without surviving male issue and was succeeded by his younger brother, the fourth Earl. He represented Sandwich and Essex in Parliament. On his death the line of the second Earl of Warwick failed and the titles were inherited by his first cousin Robert Rich, 2nd Earl Holland, who became the fifth Earl of Warwick as well. He was the son of the aforementioned Henry Rich, 1st Earl of Holland, younger son of the first Earl of Warwick (see the Earl of Holland for earlier history of this branch of the family). This line of the family failed on the early death of his grandson, the seventh Earl, in 1721. The late Earl was succeeded by his second cousin Edward Rich, the eighth Earl. He was the grandson of Cope Rich, younger son of the first Earl of Holland. On his death in 1759 all the titles became extinct.

Lady Mary Rich, daughter of the first Earl of Holland, married Sir John Campbell, 5th Baronet, who was created Earl of Breadalbane and Holland in 1681. Also, Lady Elizabeth Rich, only daughter and heiress of the fifth Earl of Warwick and second Earl of Holland, married Francis Edwardes. Their son William Edwardes succeeded to parts of the Rich estates and was created Baron Kensington in the Peerage of Ireland in 1776, a revival of the barony attached to the earldom of Holland.

Charles Rich, son of Sir Edward Rich, younger son of the second Baron Rich, was created a baronet in 1676 (see Rich baronets).

1759 creation

The title was again created in 1759 when Francis Greville, 8th Baron Brooke was made Earl of Warwick in the Peerage of Great Britain. In 1746 he had been created Earl Brooke, of Warwick Castle in the County of Warwick, in the Peerage of Great Britain. The earldom and Warwick Castle were thereby re-united for the first time in over a century. In 1767 the Earl petitioned the House of Lords for permission to use just the more prestigious title and style of "Earl of Warwick" only, with the precedence of 1746. Such permission was never granted but the Earls nevertheless ceased to use the Brooke earldom in style, and have always been known (except in the House of Lords) simply as the Earl of Warwick.

The first Earl was succeeded by his eldest son, the second Earl. He represented Warwick in Parliament and served as a Lord of Trade and as Lord Lieutenant of Warwickshire. His eldest son from his second marriage, the third Earl, sat as Member of Parliament for Warwick and held minor office in the second administration of Sir Robert Peel. He was also Lord Lieutenant of Warwickshire. He was succeeded by his son, the fourth Earl. He represented Warwickshire South in the House of Commons. His eldest son, the fifth Earl, was Conservative Member of Parliament for Somerset East and served as Lord Lieutenant of Essex. As of 2018, the titles are held by the latter's great-great-grandson, the ninth Earl, who succeeded his father in 1996.

List of titleholders

Earls of Warwick; First creation (1088)
Henry de Beaumont, 1st Earl of Warwick (died 1119)
Roger de Beaumont, 2nd Earl of Warwick (c. 1102 – 1153), son, who married Gundred de Warenne, daughter of William de Warenne, 2nd Earl of Surrey and Elizabeth de Vermandois.
William de Beaumont, 3rd Earl of Warwick (before 1140 – 1184), son, 
Waleran de Beaumont, 4th Earl of Warwick (1153–1204), younger brother
Henry de Beaumont, 5th Earl of Warwick (c.1192–1229), son
Thomas de Beaumont, 6th Earl of Warwick (1208–1242), son
Margaret de Beaumont, 7th Countess of Warwick (died 1253), sister
John Marshal, jure uxoris 7th Earl of Warwick (died 1242)
John du Plessis, jure uxoris 7th Earl of Warwick (died 1263)
William Mauduit, 8th Earl of Warwick (c. 1221 – 1268), grandson of Waleran, half-cousin of Margaret
William de Beauchamp, 9th Earl of Warwick (c. 1238 – 1298), great-grandson of Waleran, nephew of William (8th)
Guy de Beauchamp, 10th Earl of Warwick (c. 1272 – 1315), son of William (9th)
Thomas de Beauchamp, 11th Earl of Warwick (c. 1313 – 1369), son of Guy
Thomas de Beauchamp, 12th Earl of Warwick (1338–1401), son of Thomas (11th)
Richard de Beauchamp, 13th Earl of Warwick (1382–1439), son of Thomas (12th), the Earl of Warwick in Shakespeare's First Part of Henry the Sixth
Henry de Beauchamp, 14th Earl of Warwick (1425–1446), son of Richard (created Duke of Warwick in 1445)
Anne de Beauchamp, 15th Countess of Warwick (1444–1449), daughter of Henry (14th)
Anne Neville, 16th Countess of Warwick (1426–1492), daughter of Richard (13th)
Richard Neville, jure uxoris 16th Earl of Warwick (1428–1471) (Warwick the Kingmaker)
Edward Plantagenet, 17th Earl of Warwick (1475–1499), grandson of Anne (16th)

Duke of Warwick (1445–1446)
Henry de Beauchamp, 1st Duke of Warwick (1425–1446)

Earls of Warwick; Second creation (1547)
John Dudley, 1st Duke of Northumberland, 1st Earl of Warwick (1504–1553)
John Dudley, 2nd Earl of Warwick (c. 1527 – 1554)
Ambrose Dudley, 3rd Earl of Warwick (c. 1530 – 1590)

Earls of Warwick; Third creation (1618)
Other title: Baron Rich (1547)
Robert Rich, 1st Earl of Warwick (1559–1619)
Robert Rich, 2nd Earl of Warwick (1587–1658)
Robert Rich, 3rd Earl of Warwick (1611–1659)
Charles Rich, 4th Earl of Warwick (1623–1673)
Robert Rich, 5th Earl of Warwick, 2nd Earl of Holland (1620–1675)
Henry Rich, Lord Kensington (1642–1659)
Edward Rich, 6th Earl of Warwick, 3rd Earl of Holland (1673–1701)
Edward Henry Rich, 7th Earl of Warwick, 4th Earl of Holland (1698–1721)
Edward Rich, 8th Earl of Warwick, 5th Earl of Holland (1695–1759)

Earls of Warwick; Fourth creation (1759), also Earls Brooke (1746)
Other title: Baron Brooke (1621)
Francis Greville, 1st Earl of Warwick, 1st Earl Brooke (1719–1773)
George Greville, 2nd Earl of Warwick, 2nd Earl Brooke (1746–1816)
George Greville, Lord Brooke (1772–1786)
Henry Richard Greville, 3rd Earl of Warwick, 3rd Earl Brooke (1779–1853)
George Guy Greville, 4th Earl of Warwick, 4th Earl Brooke (1818–1893)
Francis Richard Charles Greville, 5th Earl of Warwick, 5th Earl Brooke (1853–1924)
Leopold Guy Francis Maynard Greville, 6th Earl of Warwick, 6th Earl Brooke (1882–1928)
Charles Guy Fulke Greville, 7th Earl of Warwick, 7th Earl Brooke (1911–1984)
David Robin Francis Guy Greville, 8th Earl of Warwick, 8th Earl Brooke (1934–1996)
Guy David Greville, 9th Earl of Warwick, 9th Earl Brooke (born 1957)

Present peer
Guy David Greville, 9th Earl of Warwick (born 30 June 1957) is the son of the 8th Earl and his wife Sarah Anne Chester Beatty. He was educated at Eton College and the Ecole de Roches in France and was styled as Lord Brooke between 1984 and 1996. 

On 20 January 1996 he succeeded his father as Earl of Warwick (G.B., 1759), Earl Brooke of Warwick Castle (G.B., 1746), and Baron Brooke of Beauchamps Court (E., 1621).

In 1981 he married firstly Susan McKinley Wilson, daughter of George William McKinley Wilson; they were divorced in 1992. On 2 October 1996 he married secondly Louisa Heenan, daughter of Dr Peter Heenan. With his first wife he has one son:

Charles Fulke Chester Greville, Lord Brooke (born 1982), the heir apparent

Other uses 
 Earl of Warwick was one of the GWR 3031 Class locomotives that were built for and run on the Great Western Railway between 1891 and 1915.
 The Guy Earl of Warwick is a public house in Welling, Dartford.
 "Riccardo, Earl of Warwick and governor of Boston" is a fictional character and lead role for tenor in the traditional setting of Giuseppe Verdi's opera, Un ballo in maschera.

See also
Duke of Northumberland (1551 creation)
Daisy Greville, Countess of Warwick
Baron Willoughby de Broke
Baron Greville
Earl of Holland
Earl of Breadalbane and Holland
Baron Kensington
Rich baronets

Notes

References 
Kidd, Charles, Williamson, David (editors). Debrett's Peerage and Baronetage (1990 edition). New York: St Martin's Press, 1990,

External links

Pedigree of Guy Greville, 9th Earl of Warwick

Extinct earldoms in the Peerage of England
Earldoms in the Peerage of Great Britain
Noble titles created in 1088
Noble titles created in 1547
Noble titles created in 1618
Noble titles created in 1759
Warwick
Warwick
Earls of Warwick
Forfeited earldoms in the Peerage of England